Mikhail Pavlovich Trufanov (November 22, 1921 – April 24, 1988) was a Soviet Russian painter and Honored Artist of the Russian Federation. He lived and worked in Leningrad and is regarded as one of the brightest representatives of the Leningrad school of painting, most famous for his portrait paintings.

Biography 
Mikhail Pavlovich Trufanov was born November 22, 1921, in village of Nyzhnie Peny, Kursk Governorate, Soviet Russia (now Rakityansky District, Belgorod Oblast) in a working-class family.

Soon the family moved to industrial city Makeevka located in eastern Ukraine within the Donetsk Province, 25 km (16 mi) from the Donetsk city. Here, Trufanov spent his childhood and teenage years. This time impressions influenced in the future on the formation of the young artist and choose the theme for his main paintings.

In 1937–1940, Trufanov studied at the Odessa Art School, which ended only after World War II in 1945. In 1941-1944, Trufanov took part in the Great Patriotic War. He was wounded and received military awards.

In 1945, Trufanov joined the painting department of the Leningrad Institute of Painting, Sculpture and Architecture named after Ilya Repin. He studied of Boris Fogel, Leonid Ovsannikov, Alexander Zaytsev.

In 1951, Trufanov graduated from Ilya Repin Institute in Boris Ioganson personal Art Studio. His graduation work was a historical painting named "In the headquarters of Kovpak", dedicated to partisan movement in the years of the Great Patriotic War.

Starting in 1951, Michael Trufanov participated in Art Exhibitions. He painted portraits, genre compositions and landscapes, and worked in oil painting, drawing and printing. Widely known artist received for the painting "Furnaceman" (1954, Tretyakov Gallery). Solo Exhibitions by Michael Trufanov was in Leningrad in 1986.

The appearance of a new hero, a new image of working man in Soviet art of the 1950s was connected with the painting "Furnaceman" and other works by Trufanov. They embody a collective image of blast-furnace operators, miners, steelworkers, and brought the author well-deserved recognition.<ref>Sergei V. Ivanov. Unknown Socialist Realism. The Leningrad School.- Saint Petersburg: NP-Print Edition, 2007. – pp. 371,</ref>

In 1951, Trufanov was admitted to the Leningrad Union of Artists. In 1963 he was awarded the honorary title of Honored Artist of Russian Federation.

Mikhail Pavlovich Trufanov died on April 24, 1988 in Leningrad. His paintings reside in State Russian Museum, State Tretyakov Gallery, in the lot of Art museums and private collections in Russia, England, China, Japan, in the U.S., and throughout the world.

See also
 Leningrad School of Painting
 List of Russian artists
 List of 20th-century Russian painters
 List of painters of Saint Petersburg Union of Artists
 Saint Petersburg Union of Artists

References

 Sources 
 Lev Mochalov. Mikhail Pavlovich Trufanov. - Leningrad: Khudozhnik RSFSR, 1965. - 48 p.
 Russian Paintings. 1989 Winter Show. - London: Roy Miles Gallery, 1989. - p. 5,43-45.
 Matthew C. Bown. Dictionary of 20th Century Russian and Soviet Painters 1900-1980s. - London: Izomar, 1998. , .
 Vern G. Swanson. Soviet Impressionism. - Woodbridge, England: Antique Collectors' Club, 2001. - , .
 Sergei V. Ivanov. Unknown Socialist Realism. The Leningrad School.'' - Saint Petersburg: NP-Print Edition, 2007. – pp. 9, 18, 20, 181, 233, 343, 344, 352, 371, 389-400, 402, 404-406, 439, 445 . , .

1921 births
1988 deaths
People from Belgorod Oblast
Soviet painters
Socialist realist artists
Leningrad School artists
Members of the Leningrad Union of Artists
Repin Institute of Arts alumni
Soviet military personnel of World War II
Recipients of the Medal "For Courage" (Russia)
Honored Artists of the Russian Federation
20th-century Russian male artists